Smoke and mirrors is a metaphor, originating from 18th and 19th-century phantasmagoria shows, for a deceptive, fraudulent or insubstantial explanation or description

Smoke and mirrors may also refer to:

Arts, entertainment, and media

Literature
 Smoke and Mirrors (Gaiman book), a 1998 short story and poetry collection by Neil Gaiman
 Smoke and Mirrors (novel), a 2008 crime novel by Kel Robertson
Smoke and Mirrors (2016), the third novel in Elly Griffiths' Stephens & Mephisto Mystery series
 Smoke and Mirrors (2005), a novel by Tanya Huff in the Smoke Books series

Albums
 Smoke + Mirrors, a 2015 album by Imagine Dragons
 Smoke & Mirrors (The Datsuns album), 2006
 Smoke & Mirrors (Lifehouse album), 2010
 Smoke & Mirrors (The Petty Thefts album), or the title song
 Smoke & Mirrors (The Fizz album), 2020
 Smoke and Mirrors (O.C. album), 2005
 Smoke and Mirrors (Brett Dennen album), 2013
 Smoke and Mirrors (Lynch Mob album), 2009
 Smoke n Mirrors, an album by B-Real, or the title song
 Smoke and Mirrors, an album by Martin Simpson
 Smoke and Mirrors, an EP by The Casket Lottery
 Smoke & Mirrors, a DVD by Arena
 Smoke and Mirrors, the debut album by The Eden House

Songs
 "Smoke & Mirrors" (song), a 2010 song by Paloma Faith
 "Smoke & Mirrors", a song by Demi Lovato from her album Tell Me You Love Me
 "Smoke & Mirrors", a song by No Malice from his album Hear Ye Him
 "Smoke & Mirrors", a song by Skye Sweetnam from her album Noise from the Basement
 "Smoke and Mirrors", a song by The Magnetic Fields from Get Lost
 "Smoke and Mirrors", a song by The Receiving End of Sirens from The Earth Sings Mi Fa Mi
 "Smoke and Mirrors", a song by RJD2 from Deadringer
 "Smoke and Mirrors", a song by Symphony X from Twilight in Olympus
 "Smoke and Mirrors", a song by Poets of the Fall from Twilight Theater
 "Smoke and Mirrors", a song used as the entrance theme of WWE wrestler Cody Rhodes
 "Smoke and Mirrors", a song by Gotye from his third studio album Making Mirrors
 "Smoke and Mirrors", a song by Black Veil Brides from their 2011 album Set the World on Fire
 "Smoke and Mirrors", a song by Puscifer from their 2015 album Money Shot
 "Smoke 'N' Mirrors", a song by KSI featuring Tiggs da Author, Lunar C and Nick Brewer from the 2016 extended play Keep Up
 "Mirrors & Smoke", a song by Jars of Clay from their 2006 album Good Monsters

Television
 "Smoke & Mirrors" (Agent Carter), an episode of the second season of Agent Carter
 "Smoke and Mirrors" (Spooks), an episode of the television series Spooks
 "Smoke & Mirrors" (Stargate SG-1), an episode of the television series Stargate SG-1
 "Smoke and Mirrors", an episode of the television series The IT Crowd
 "Smoke and Mirrors", the debut episode of the third season of Marvel's Runaways

Other arts, entertainment, and media
Smoke & Mirrors (2016 film), a Spanish thriller film
 Smoke and Mirrors, a 2012 comic series by Mike Costa
 Penn & Teller's Smoke and Mirrors, an unreleased video game
 Smoke & Mirrors E-zine, an electronic magazine for magicians and mentalists
 "Smoke and Mirrors", from the series of audiobooks Doctor Who: Destiny of the Doctor
 Smoke and Mirrors: The War on Drugs and the Politics of Failure, 1996 book by Dan Baum

Technology
 Smoke & Mirrors, one of three codenames for the Twentieth Anniversary Macintosh